Picos, also known as Achada Igreja, is a city in the central part of the island of Santiago, Cape Verde. It is the seat of São Salvador do Mundo municipality. Picos is located 4 km southeast of Assomada and 23 km northwest of the capital city of Praia, near the national road from Praia to Tarrafal via Assomada (EN1-ST01).

Picos is surrounded by mountains, and lies about 4 km north of the highest peak of the island of Santiago, Pico de Antónia.

History
Picos was the seat of the municipality of Santa Catarina between 1834 and 1859.  In May 2005, the parish of São Salvador do Mundo was split from the municipality of Santa Catarina to become a separate municipality, and Picos became its seat.

References

External links

Plano comunal de São Salvador do Mundo (May 2009, p. 28) 

São Salvador do Mundo, Cape Verde
Geography of Santiago, Cape Verde
Cities in Cape Verde
Municipal seats in Cape Verde